Eagle's Whistle is the debut album by Irish folk group Crubeen released on LP record by EMI Ireland in 1976.

Background and recording
Crubeen was formed in the early 1970s. They recorded and produced in Dublin.

Crubeen released their debut album Eagle's Whistle in 1976 with EMI Ireland and followed it up by another album with the simple title 'Crubeen' in 1978 released by CBS records. They also featured on a number of compilations albums 'Best of Irish Folk'  alongside The Sands Family and Planxty.

Release history

Eagle's Whistle track listing 1976

Personnel
Crubeen
 Benny McKay: bodhran and vocals
 Eddie Ruddy: flute, whistle, and concertina
 Barney Gribben: banjo, mandolin, concertina, harmonica
 Tommy Hollywood: guitar, mandolin, vocals
 Paddy Clerkin: vocals, guitar, double bass, five string banjo
 John Waterson: fiddle, viola, dulcimer
 Billy Fegan: tin whistle, harmonica and vocals

Production team
 Leo O'Kelly – production
 Bob Harper – engineering
 Ronnie Norton – cover design & photography

References

1976 debut albums
Crubeen (band) albums
Albums produced by Leo O'Kelly
EMI Records albums